Chaerophyllum is a genus of flowering plant in the family Apiaceae, with 35 species native to Europe, Asia, North America,  and northern Africa. It includes the cultivated root vegetable Chaerophyllum bulbosum (turnip rooted chervil).

Species
, Plants of the World Online accepted 69 species:

Chaerophyllum aksekiense A.Duran & H.Duman
Chaerophyllum andicola (Kunth) K.F.Chung
Chaerophyllum angelicifolium M.Bieb.
Chaerophyllum argenteum (Hook.f.) K.F.Chung
Chaerophyllum aromaticum L.
Chaerophyllum astrantiae Boiss. & Balansa
Chaerophyllum atlanticum Coss. ex Batt.
Chaerophyllum aurantiacum Post
Chaerophyllum aureum L.
Chaerophyllum australianum K.F.Chung
Chaerophyllum azorellaceum (Buwalda) K.F.Chung
Chaerophyllum azoricum Trel.
Chaerophyllum basicola (Heenan & Molloy) K.F.Chung
Chaerophyllum bobrovii Schischk.
Chaerophyllum borneense (Merr.) K.F.Chung
Chaerophyllum borodinii Albov
Chaerophyllum brevipes (Mathias & Constance) K.F.Chung
Chaerophyllum bulbosum L.
Chaerophyllum buwaldianum (Mathias & Constance) K.F.Chung
Chaerophyllum byzantinum Boiss.
Chaerophyllum colensoi (Hook.f.) K.F.Chung
Chaerophyllum coloratum L.
Chaerophyllum confusum Woronow ex Grossh.
Chaerophyllum creticum Boiss. & Heldr.
Chaerophyllum crinitum Boiss.
Chaerophyllum dasycarpum (Hook. ex S.Watson) Nutt. ex Bush
Chaerophyllum daucoides (d'Urv.) K.F.Chung
Chaerophyllum elegans Gaudin
Chaerophyllum eriopodum (DC.) K.F.Chung
Chaerophyllum guatemalense K.F.Chung
Chaerophyllum gunnii (Mathias & Constance) K.F.Chung
Chaerophyllum hakkiaricum Hedge & Lamond
Chaerophyllum heldreichii Orph.
Chaerophyllum hirsutum L.
Chaerophyllum humile M.Bieb.
Chaerophyllum involucratum (Hayata) K.F.Chung
Chaerophyllum karsianum Kit Tan & Ocakv.
Chaerophyllum khorossanicum Czerniak. ex Schischk.
Chaerophyllum leucolaenum Boiss.
Chaerophyllum libanoticum Boiss. & Kotschy
Chaerophyllum lineare (Hemsl.) K.F.Chung
Chaerophyllum macropodum Boiss.
Chaerophyllum macrospermum (Willd. ex Schult.) Fisch. & C.A.Mey. ex Hohen.
Chaerophyllum meyeri Boiss. & Buhse
Chaerophyllum nanhuense (Chih H.Chen & J.C.Wang) K.F.Chung
Chaerophyllum nivale Hedge & Lamond
Chaerophyllum nodosum (L.) Crantz
Chaerophyllum novae-zelandiae K.F.Chung
Chaerophyllum orizabae (I.M.Johnst.) K.F.Chung
Chaerophyllum papuanum (Buwalda) K.F.Chung
Chaerophyllum plicatum (Mathias & Constance) K.F.Chung
Chaerophyllum posofianum Erik & Demirkus
Chaerophyllum prescottii DC.
Chaerophyllum procumbens (L.) Crantz
Chaerophyllum pulvinificum (F.Muell.) K.F.Chung
Chaerophyllum pumilum (Ridl.) K.F.Chung
Chaerophyllum ramosum (Hook.f.) K.F.Chung
Chaerophyllum reflexum Lindl.
Chaerophyllum roseum M.Bieb.
Chaerophyllum rubellum Albov
Chaerophyllum sessiliflorum (Hook.f.) K.F.Chung
Chaerophyllum syriacum Heldr. & Ehrenb. ex Boiss.
Chaerophyllum tainturieri Hook. & Arn.
Chaerophyllum taiwanianum (Masam.) K.F.Chung
Chaerophyllum temulum L.
Chaerophyllum tenuifolium Poir.
Chaerophyllum tolucanum (I.M.Johnst.) K.F.Chung
Chaerophyllum villarsii W.D.J.Koch
Chaerophyllum villosum Wall. ex DC.

References

External links

 
Apioideae genera
Taxa named by Carl Linnaeus